The FA Cup 1984–85 is the 104th season of the world's oldest football knockout competition; The Football Association Challenge Cup, or FA Cup for short. The large number of clubs entering the tournament from lower down the English football league system meant that the competition started with a number of preliminary and qualifying rounds. The 28 victorious teams from the Fourth Round Qualifying progressed to the First Round Proper.

Preliminary round

Ties

Replays

2nd replays

1st qualifying round

Ties

Replays

2nd replays

2nd qualifying round

Ties

Replays

2nd replays

3rd replay

3rd qualifying round

Ties

Replays

2nd replays

4th qualifying round
The teams given byes to this round were Maidstone United, Worcester City, Barnet, Scarborough, Enfield, Weymouth, Boston United, Dagenham, Kettering Town, Yeovil Town, Dartford, Wycombe Wanderers, Bishop's Stortford, Mossley, Workington, Barking, Penrith, Macclesfield Town, Harrow Borough and Windsor & Eton.

Ties

Replays

2nd replays

1984–85 FA Cup
See 1984-85 FA Cup for details of the rounds from the First Round Proper onwards.

External links
Football Club History Database: FA Cup 1984–85
FA Cup Past Results

Qual
FA Cup qualifying rounds